The Difference Between Me and You Is that I'm Not on Fire is the third and final studio album from Welsh indie rock band Mclusky.  It was released to positive reviews by Too Pure in 2004. The two singles to be released from this album were "That Man Will Not Hang" and "She Will Only Bring You Happiness" ("1956 and All That" – albeit a different recording – had appeared as a double-A-side with the stand-alone single "There Ain't No Fool in Ferguson", released between The Difference... and Mclusky Do Dallas), though it was later revealed in the liner notes of Mcluskyism that "Without MSG I Am Nothing" had been intended for single release, but the band's implosion prevented this from happening.

Track listing
(All songs: Falkous, Chapple, Egglestone, unless noted)
"Without MSG I Am Nothing" – 2:57 (Falkous, Chapple, Harding)
"That Man Will Not Hang" – 3:00
"She Will Only Bring You Happiness" – 3:27
"KKKitchens, What Were You Thinking?" – 1:50
"Your Children Are Waiting for You to Die" – 3:54
"Icarus Smicarus" – 1:51
"Slay!" – 2:54
"You Should Be Ashamed, Seamus" – 4:40
"Lucky Jim" – 2:02
"Forget About Him I'm Mint" – 1:46
"1956 and All That" – 2:24 (Falkous, Chapple, Harding)
"Falco vs. the Young Canoeist" – 2:12
"Support Systems" – 7:50

References

Mclusky albums
2004 albums
Too Pure albums